Bernd Gerber (born 21 December 1961) is a retired German football defender.

References

External links
 

1961 births
Living people
German footballers
Bundesliga players
2. Bundesliga players
1. FC Kaiserslautern II players
1. FC Kaiserslautern players
VfL Bochum players
Place of birth missing (living people)
Association football defenders
VfR Bürstadt players
Blau-Weiß 1890 Berlin players
SpVgg Bayreuth players